Sylwia Katarzyna Bogacka (born October 3, 1981) is a Polish sports shooter.

Bogacka was born in Jelenia Góra, Poland. Bogacka studied sociology at the University of Zielona Góra. She first competed at the 2004 Summer Olympics. Four years later, she reached the final of the 10 meter air rifle in 2008, placing eighth. She placed first in the qualifying of women's 10 meter air rifle at the 2012 Summer Olympics, before winning the silver medal in the final. Bogacka then finished fourth in the Women's 50 meter rifle three positions with a score of 681.9.

Olympic results

Personal life
She works as a soldier. Her rank is Corporal.

References

External links
 issf-sports.org

1981 births
Living people
People from Jelenia Góra
Sportspeople from Lower Silesian Voivodeship
Polish female sport shooters
ISSF rifle shooters
Olympic shooters of Poland
Olympic silver medalists for Poland
Olympic medalists in shooting
Shooters at the 2004 Summer Olympics
Shooters at the 2008 Summer Olympics
Shooters at the 2012 Summer Olympics
Shooters at the 2016 Summer Olympics
Medalists at the 2012 Summer Olympics
University of Zielona Góra alumni
21st-century Polish women